Breddan is a rural locality in the Charters Towers Region, Queensland, Australia.

Geography 
The locality is bounded to the north-east by the Burdekin River, to the south-east by Flinders Highway, and in part to the west by the Lynd Highway.

Sellheim is a town in the easternmost part of the locality. It was named after pastoralist Philip Frederic Sellheim who was the gold warden in Charters Towers from 1880 to 1888.

Mount Boddington is in the centre of the locality and is part of the Pinnacles Range.

The land use is predominantly grazing on native vegetation with some irrigated cropping in the north of the locality near the Burkedin River.

History 
The Burdekin River Pumping Station was erected as part of the important Charters Towers water supply system, constructed from 1887 to 1891 for the Burdekin Water Scheme Joint Board. When completed the scheme included a pumping station, rising main, reservoir on Tower Hill, chimney stack, engineer's residence, workers' cottages, provisional school, tram track, bridge across the Burdekin River and several trestle bridges to carry the rising main across small creeks between the pumping station and the reservoir in the town. In August 1975 a new electric pumping station was built at the weir.

In August 1942, Breddan was occupied by two squadrons of the US 38th Bombardment Group. On the departure of the US squadrons, Breddan was chosen for development as a major aircraft repair and salvage depot under RAAF control. The construction program which took place during 1943 involved the erection of maintenance hangars, engineering workshops, torpedo stores, personnel camps, a power station and medical facilities. The base was abandoned after 1947.

In the 2011 census, Breddan had a population of 388 people.

Heritage listings 
Breddan has a number of heritage-listed sites, including:
 Gregory Developmental Road: Breddan Airfield
 Weir Road: Burdekin River Pumping Station

Amenities
There is a boat ramp into the Burdekin River at Weir Road. It is managed by the Charters Towers Regional Council.

References

 
Charters Towers Region
Localities in Queensland